Anthony Caci (born 1 July 1997) is a French professional footballer who plays as a defender for German club Mainz 05.

Career
In January 2022, it was announced Caci would leave RC Strasbourg for Bundesliga side Mainz 05 in summer 2022, having agreed a contract until 2026.

Career statistics

References

External links
 Profile at the 1. FSV Mainz 05 website 
 
 

Living people
1997 births
People from Forbach
French footballers
Association football midfielders
France youth international footballers
RC Strasbourg Alsace players
1. FSV Mainz 05 players
Ligue 2 players
Ligue 1 players
Olympic footballers of France
Footballers at the 2020 Summer Olympics
French expatriate footballers
Expatriate footballers in Germany
French expatriate sportspeople in Germany
Footballers from Grand Est
Sportspeople from Moselle (department)